Diadegma major is a wasp first described by G. Szépligeti in 1916. It is a member of the genus Diadegma and family Ichneumonidae. No subspecies are listed.

References 

major

Insects described in 1916